Herb Sutter is a prominent C++ expert. He is also a book author and was a columnist for Dr. Dobb's Journal. He joined Microsoft in 2002 as a platform evangelist for Visual C++ .NET, rising to lead software architect for C++/CLI. Sutter has served as secretary and convener of the ISO C++ standards committee for over 10 years. In September 2008 he was replaced by P. J. Plauger. He then re-assumed the convener position, after Plauger resigned in October 2009. In recent years Sutter was lead designer for C++/CX and C++ AMP.

Education and career
Sutter was born and raised in Oakville, Ontario, before studying computer science at Canada's University of Waterloo.

From 1995 to 2001 he was chief technology officer at PeerDirect where he designed the PeerDirect database replication engine.

Bibliography
 Exceptional C++ (Addison-Wesley, 2000)
 More Exceptional C++ (Addison-Wesley, 2002)
 Exceptional C++ Style (Addison-Wesley, 2005)
 C++ Coding Standards (together with Andrei Alexandrescu, Addison-Wesley, 2005)

References

External links
 
 

Living people
Canadian computer programmers
People in information technology
Microsoft employees
C++ people
Year of birth missing (living people)